West Nalaut Island is an island in northern Palawan, in the Philippines. It is the westernmost of the Calamian Islands, and can form a guide to shipping entering the Coron West Passage. The uninhabited  island is privately owned. It was attempted to be sold as part of the HGTV show "Island Hunters".  

West Nalaut Island has a  crescent–shaped white sand beach,  of coastline, several smaller beach coves, -high cliffs, and rainforest coverage. It is a 30-minute speedboat journey from 12 World War II wreck dives and local towns.

The asking price in 2022 was USD ~7m. The island was used in the Million Dollar Island TV series.

See also
Busuanga, Palawan
Coron, Palawan
Culion, Palawan
List of islands of the Philippines

References 

Calamian Islands
Private islands of the Philippines